Vainom Kug is a populated place situated in Pima County, Arizona, United States. Historically, it has also been known as Kvitak, Kvitatk, Pumphouse, Quijotoa Well, Steam Pump, Steam Pump Village, and Vainomkux. Vainom kug is a O'odham term meaning "iron stands". This is a reference to the nearby abandoned mining works of the Weldon Mining Company. The name became official as a result of a Board on Geographic Names decision in 1941.

References

Populated places in Pima County, Arizona